Ann Rosalie David  (born 30 May 1946) is a British Egyptologist and emeritus professor at the University of Manchester. David served as director of the International Mummy Database.

Early life and education
David was born in Cardiff. She was inspired to become an Egyptologist when her teacher showed her a drawing of the pyramids at Abusir. She completed a Bachelor of Arts degree in ancient history at University College London in 1967. She joined the University of Liverpool for her graduate studies, gaining a PhD in 1971. Her thesis considered ancient Egyptian temple rituals.

Research and career 
David arrived at the University of Manchester in 1972. She established the Manchester Egyptian Mummy Project at the University of Manchester in 1973. In 1974 she began to give educational talks on Nile cruises. In 1975 she found mummy number 1770, which contained evidence of Guinea Worm Disease. She joined the Manchester Literary and Philosophical Society in 1976. David was the director of the KNH Centre for Biological and Forensic Studies in Egyptology at the University of Manchester for twenty five years. She was the first woman to become a professor of Egyptology. She worked as Keeper of Egyptology at the Manchester Museum. She pioneered biomedical research in Egyptology, studying disease, living conditions, pharmacy and medicine in ancient Egypt. In the late 1990s she established the only Egyptian Mummy Tissue Bank. She directed the Schistosomiasis Investigation Project. She worked in collaboration with the Ministry of Health and Population in Egypt. They found tissues of antibodies against schistosomiasis in the mummies in Manchester. She was awarded the British Council medal at the Anglo-French Medical Society in September 1999. David used Raman spectroscopy to study ancient Egyptian pigments. David was appointed an Officer of the Order of the British Empire (OBE) in the 2003 New Year Honours, "for services to Egyptology".

David is Vice President of the Egypt Exploration Society. David appeared in several film and TV shows about Egypt, working on Mummies: Secrets of the Pharaohs,  Private Lives of the Pharaohs and The Story of Science. By studying remains from Ancient Egypt, David found evidence that cancer is a man-made disease caused by modern pollution and diet in 2010. She identified that the rich banquets offered to ancient Egyptian gods could block the arteries of high priests, who took the offerings home from temples for their families. David is an emeritus professor at the University of Manchester, having retired in 2012. She spoke at TEDx King's College London in 2013.

Books 

  ©1988
 *

About David

References 

1946 births
British Egyptologists
Alumni of University College London
Alumni of the University of Manchester
Living people
20th-century British non-fiction writers
20th-century British women writers
21st-century British non-fiction writers
21st-century British women writers
Manchester Museum people